The Cat's Me-Ouch is a 1965 Tom and Jerry short produced and directed by Chuck Jones, with a story by Jones and Michael Maltese.

Plot
Jerry steps out of his mouse hole, only to be met by a cleaver-wielding Tom rising his eyebrows. Tom tries to get him with the cleaver, and after a few tries, he hides underneath the "DOG" magazine. He falls down the stairs, and when he lands at the bottom the magazine opens to a page where a bulldog can be ordered. Deciding to order one to scare Tom, he writes a letter and takes it out to the mailbox.

The delivery truck shows up and the delivery man wheels in a large crate containing a loudly-barking dog. As Jerry signs for the crate, Tom is almost too scared to look on as he takes a crowbar to the crate. Jerry whistles for the loud dog to come out and it is a tiny bulldog even smaller than Jerry is in stature.   Tom comes out to investigate and tosses the dog up a few times, pointing and laughing, which causes the dog to buzz saw his arm and tail fur off. The rest of this short sees Tom without fur covering either of his arms, although he regains that of his tail.

A satisfied Jerry pats the dog on the head, who then licks Jerry in the face and Jerry laughs in a ticklish manor. Stepping back, the dog feels an itch and scratches at a flea. When the stubborn flea will not come off, the dog buzz saws his tail, killing the flea. The now-proud dog suddenly finds Jerry gone and tries to find him, searching around the crate, falling, and whimpering before seeing Tom in the window, holding Jerry by the tail in one hand and flicking his head with the other. The angry dog charges up, running around the yard, and as he is about to charge into Tom, he shuts the door while Jerry is trapped in a jar. The door, however, was no match for the dog who brings it down from the top. Tom and the dog flip the door over lengthwise and width-wise until the door is back in the door frame, and Tom is on the outside. Realizing his predicament, he runs and grabs an ax and tries to chop down the door as the dog opens the lid on the jar, landing in with the now-free Jerry. The two watch Tom, and when he breaks in, the dog buzz saws the ax handle, leaving the blade part to fall and hit his foot as Tom yells in pain before the dog buzzsaws his entire body.

At night, a heavily bandaged Tom heads to the hospital. Tom winces in pain while the doctor unwraps his foot, revealing the dog is still biting. Tom shrugs before unwrapping his tail, which Jerry is biting.

Production notes
The title The Cat's Me-Ouch! is a pun on "the cat's meow", a phrase by Thomas A. Dorgan. The film features a small bulldog who later also appeared in Purr-Chance to Dream (1967).

Additional Crew and Cast
Vocal Effects: June Foray, Mel Blanc
Production Supervisor ("In Charge"): Les Goldman
Graphics: Don Foster
Design Consultant: Maurice Noble
Stock Music composed by: Scott Bradley
Additional Music by: Eugene Poddany

References

External links

1965 animated films
1965 films
1965 short films
1960s animated short films
Tom and Jerry short films
Short films directed by Chuck Jones
Films directed by Maurice Noble
Films scored by Eugene Poddany
1960s American animated films
1965 comedy films
Animated films without speech
Metro-Goldwyn-Mayer short films
Metro-Goldwyn-Mayer animated short films
Animated films about dogs
MGM Animation/Visual Arts short films
Films with screenplays by Michael Maltese